Daniel "Dan" Joseph Landry (born January 15, 1970, in San Diego, California) is an American former volleyball player. He was a member of the United States men's national volleyball team that finished in ninth place at the 1996 Summer Olympics in Atlanta, Georgia.

References
 Profile at The Washington Post

1970 births
Living people
American men's volleyball players
Volleyball players at the 1996 Summer Olympics
Volleyball players at the 2000 Summer Olympics
Olympic volleyball players of the United States
Volleyball players from San Diego
Pan American Games silver medalists for the United States
Pan American Games medalists in volleyball
Volleyball players at the 1995 Pan American Games
Medalists at the 1995 Pan American Games
UCLA Bruins men's volleyball players